The Dzirula is a river of Georgia. It is a right tributary of the Qvirila, which it joins east of the town Zestaponi.

References

Rivers of Georgia (country)